An outlaw is a person who is declared as no longer protected by the law.

Outlaw or Outlawed may also refer to:

Entertainment

Films and television
 The Outlaw, a 1943 western directed by Howard Hughes
 Útlaginn (The Outlaw), a 1981 Icelandic film
 Outlaw (1999 film), a 1999 Italian film
 Outlaw (2007 film), a 2007 action-crime-drama film written and directed by Nick Love
 Outlawed (1921 film), American film directed by Alan Lang
 Outlawed (1929 film), American film directed by Eugene Forde
 The Outlaw (1939 film), a 1939 Argentine film
 The Outlaw (1953 film), a 1953 Iranian film
 The Outlaw (2010 film), a Spanish-language film about Lope de Vega
 Outlaw Productions, American film production company formed by Robert Newmyer
 Outlaw (TV series), an American television courtroom drama (2010)
 "Outlaw" (Justified), an episode

Music
 Outlaw Recordz, an American hip-hop record label
 Outlaw (Alabama 3 album)
 Outlaw (Mark Chesnutt album), 2010
 Outlaw (War album), also a title track
 Outlawed (album), by Attila
 "Outlaw" (50 Cent song), 2011
 "Outlaw" (Olive song), 1996
 "Outlaw", by Riot from the album Fire Down Under, re-recorded in Nightbreaker
 "Outlaw", by Selena Gomez & the Scene from the album When the Sun Goes Down
 "The Outlaw", by HammerFall from the album Infected
 Outlaw music, a music genre started in Texas in 1960
 K229CC in Des Moines, Iowa, known as 93.7 the Outlaw
 W288CQ in Asheville, North Carolina, known as 105.5 the Outlaw
 WGLD-FM, and its simulcast partner WXJY in Myrtle Beach, South Carolina, once known as 93.9 the Outlaw
 WOTX in Lunenburg, Vermont, known as 93.7 the Outlaw

Other
 Outlaw (comics), a fictional character created by Marvel Comics
 Outlawed (comics), a 2020 storyline for Marvel Comics
 Outlaw (novel), the first novel of the Outlaw Chronicles series by Angus Donald
 Outlaw (stock character)
 The Outlaw (play), an 1871 one-act play by Swedish playwright August Strindberg
 Outlaw (video game), a 1976 single-player Atari Inc. game
 Outlawed (novel), 2021 novel by Anna North

Other uses
 Outlaw (name), a surname
 Joe Swail (born 1969), professional snooker player nicknamed "The Outlaw"
 Outlaw motorcycle club, a type of criminal or non-conforming motorcycle club
 Outlaw (railroading jargon), a crew (or train) which can no longer move because they have reached the maximum number of hours they are allowed to work
 Outlaw (roller coaster), a wooden roller coaster at Adventureland in Altoona, Iowa
 Outlaw Rock, a rock near Adelaide Island, Antarctica
 OUT-LAW, a legal news and information website
 Griffon Aerospace MQM-170 Outlaw, an unmanned aerial vehicle
 "Outlaw" Ron Bass (1948–2017), former American professional wrestler
 "Outlaw" Maxx Crismon, a professional wrestler one half of the tag-team Assault and Battery managed by Captain Lou Albano
 The Outlaw, a bridge built between Canada and the US on Ontario Highway 61
 Outlaw Run A roller coaster at Silver Dollar City in Branson, MO

See also
 
 Outlaws (disambiguation)